Antimimistis illaudata is a moth in the family Geometridae. It is found in Queensland, Australia.

References

Moths described in 1922
Eupitheciini
Moths of Australia